Red Tai language can mean the following,
 Tai Daeng language
 Tai Laing language